The 2020–21 Biathlon World Cup – Mixed Relay started on 10 January 2021 in Oberhof and will finished on 14 March 2021 in Nové Město

Competition format
The relay teams consist of four biathletes. Legs 1 and 2 are skied by either the two men or the two women; legs 3 and 4 are skied by the remaining athletes. The race concists of either four  legs or four  legs. Every athlete's leg is skied over three laps, with two shooting rounds: one prone and one standing. For every round of five targets there are eight bullets available, though the last three can only be single-loaded manually from the spare round holders or from bullets deposited by the athlete into trays or onto the mat at the firing line. If after eight bullets there are still standing targets, one  penalty loop must be taken for each remaining target. The first-leg participants all start at the same time, and as in cross-country skiing relays, every athlete of a team must touch the team's next-leg participant to perform a valid changeover. On the first shooting stage of the first leg, the participant must shoot in the lane corresponding to their bib number (bib #10 shoots at lane #10 regardless of their position in the race), then for the remainder of the relay, the athletes shoot at the lane corresponding to the position they arrived (arrive at the range in 5th place, shoot at lane five).

The single mixed relay involves one male and one female biathlete each completing two legs consisting of one prone and one standing shoot. The starting biathletes all start the race at the same time and complete one  leg before exchanging with their partner who completes another  leg. The athlete then exchanges back with their partner who completes another  leg before exchanging back and completing a final  leg, which includes an extra lap after the final shoot. The rules regarding shooting are the same as in the regular mixed relay.

2019–20 Top 3 standings

Medal winners

Standings
4 of 6 competitions scored

References

Mixed Men